The 1924 Quantico Marines Devil Dogs football team represented the Quantico Marine Base in the 1924 college football season. The team went undefeated with a single tie, finishing with a record of 7–0–1; all seven wins were by shutout. The team was led by fourth-year head coach John Beckett; Frank Goettge starred at fullback. The team did not play any games at their home field in Quantico, Virginia, as six games were played at opponent's home fields and two games against other military teams were played at neutral sites.

Schedule

Notes

References

Quantico
Quantico Marines Devil Dogs football seasons
College football undefeated seasons
Quantico Marines Devil Dogs football